Rena is the administrative centre of Åmot Municipality in Innlandet county, Norway. The village is located at the confluence of the rivers Glomma (Norway's longest river) and Rena (a tributary to Glomma).

The Rena Campus of the Inland Norway University of Applied Sciences is located in Rena. It has a modern school building plus student dormitories at this site. There are also two Chinese restaurants, a public cinema, and several hotels in the village. Åmot Church is also located in the village as well. Rena is the starting point of both the Birkebeinerrennet ski race and the Birkebeinerrittet Mountain bike race.

The village lies within the Østerdalen valley which is a mountainous and forested area. The surrounding area has several lakes, forests and rivers. Just northeast of Rena is the Rena Military Camp, Norway's largest military camp. This area is used by the military for special forces training.

Climate
Rena has a subarctic climate (Dfc) although it has some of the warmest summer days in Norway. Winters are very cold and snowy.

Notable people

References

Villages in Innlandet
Populated places on the Glomma River
Åmot